Timothy Hugh Corcoran (born April 15, 1978) is an American former professional baseball pitcher. He played in Major League Baseball (MLB) for the Tampa Bay Devil Rays and in Nippon Professional Baseball (NPB) for the Yokohama DeNA BayStars. Corcoran's brother, Roy Corcoran, also played professional baseball

Professional career

New York Mets
Corcoran was selected by the New York Mets in the 44th round of the 1996 MLB Draft out of Jackson High School. He began his professional career with the Kingsport Mets in 1997 and played in the Mets farm system through 2000. He played with Kingsport (1997), the Gulf Coast Mets (1997), and St. Lucie Mets (1998) but spent most of his time with the Capital City Bombers.

Baltimore Orioles
On December 11, 2000, he was selected from the Mets by the Baltimore Orioles in the minor league portion of the Rule 5 draft. He remained with the Orioles farm system through 2003, mostly with the Double-A Bowie Baysox.

Tampa Bay Devil Rays
In December 2003, he was once more selected in the minor league portion of the Rule 5 draft, this time by the Tampa Bay Devil Rays. The Devil Rays assigned him to the AAA Durham Bulls for 2004 and 2005.

Corcoran made his Major League debut on June 14, 2005 for the Devil Rays against the Milwaukee Brewers, working two scoreless innings of relief.

He went into  spring training looking to stay in the majors, but was sent down to Triple-A to begin the season and not recalled until June 15 (due to an injury to closer Tyler Walker). He appeared in three relief appearances before getting a spot start in place of recently demoted Seth McClung. He pitched well enough to remain in the rotation, going 5–9 with a 4.38 ERA in 16 starts and 5 relief appearances.

He started the  season with Triple-A Durham and was recalled by the Devil Rays after Juan Salas received a 50-game suspension following a positive drug test. On June 11, however, Corcoran was optioned back to the minors.

Florida Marlins
On Jan. 4, he signed a minor league deal with the Florida Marlins, and spent most of the year playing for their Double-A team, the Carolina Mudcats.

Los Angeles Dodgers
He became a free agent at the end of the season and signed a minor league contract with the Los Angeles Dodgers in March . With the Dodgers, he played for the AA Chattanooga Lookouts and AAA Albuquerque Isotopes. He spent the entire 2011 season on the disabled list for Albuquerque after undergoing Tommy John surgery on his elbow.

He began 2012 pitching for the Delfines del Carmen in the Mexican League before returning to the Isotopes in August.

References

External links

1978 births
Living people
Albuquerque Isotopes players
American expatriate baseball players in Japan
American expatriate baseball players in Mexico
Arizona League Dodgers players
Baseball players from Baton Rouge, Louisiana
Bowie Baysox players
Capital City Bombers players
Carolina Mudcats players
Chattanooga Lookouts players
Delfines de Ciudad del Carmen players
Durham Bulls players
Frederick Keys players
Gulf Coast Mets players
Gulf Coast State Commodores baseball players
Gwinnett Braves players
Jupiter Hammerheads players
Kingsport Mets players
Major League Baseball pitchers
Mexican League baseball pitchers
Montgomery Biscuits players
Nippon Professional Baseball pitchers
St. Lucie Mets players
Sugar Land Skeeters players
Tampa Bay Devil Rays players
Yokohama DeNA BayStars players